Boek Phrai is a subdistrict (tambon) in Ban Pong District, Ratchaburi Province, Thailand. It is also a township (thesaban tambon). Boek Phrai includes 12 villages under the Boek Phrai township administration. Industries in Boek Phrai include a sugar factory, tapioca starch industry, steel, and electronics.

References

Tambon of Ratchaburi Province
Populated places in Ratchaburi province